California's 2nd district may refer to:

 California's 2nd congressional district
 California's 2nd State Assembly district
 California's 2nd State Senate district